Hyloxalus betancuri is a species of frogs in the family Dendrobatidae. It is endemic to Colombia where it is only known from its type locality in Ituango, Antioquia Department, on the Cordillera Occidental at  asl.
Its natural habitats are sub-Andean forests where it can be found on the ground next to streams. There are no known threats to this species, and the type locality is within the Parque Nacional Natural Paramillo.

References

betancuri
Amphibians of the Andes
Amphibians of Colombia
Endemic fauna of Colombia
Taxa named by Juan A. Rivero
Taxa named by Marco Antonio Serna Díaz
Amphibians described in 1991
Taxonomy articles created by Polbot